Builth Wells Hospital was a heath facility in Bronllys, Wales. It was managed by Powys Teaching Health Board.

History
The hospital, which was designed by Telfer Smith, opened as Builth Wells Cottage Hospital in 1897. The hospital joined the National Health Service in 1948. After the Glan-Irfon Health & Social Care Centre opened in the town, the hospital closed in 2013. The old hospital site was subsequently acquired by Wales & West Housing for redevelopment for residential use.

References

Hospitals in Powys
Hospitals established in 1897
1897 establishments in Wales
Hospital buildings completed in 1897
Defunct hospitals in Wales